Gary Alan Epper (December 31, 1944 - December 1, 2007 in Los Angeles, California) was an American stunt performer, coordinator and occasional actor. Part of a major stunt family dynasty in Hollywood, he was the son of John Epper,  the brother of fellow Star Trek stuntmen Tony Epper and Andy Epper and stuntwoman Jeannie Epper. His family traces its lineage back to "a colonel in Napoleon's army" and his great-grandson, a multi-lingual Swiss who eventually lived in California where he began the family tradition in stunt work and the tradition has passed down from each generation.

Epper worked on some of the most successful Hollywood blockbuster films and television series of all time, including Lassie (1954), Hawaii Five-O (1968), Beneath the Planet of the Apes (1970), Conquest of the Planet of the Apes (1972), Magnum Force (1973), Starsky and Hutch (1975-1979), Charlie's Angels (1980-1981), Blade Runner (1982), Scarface (1983), Top Gun (1986), The Untouchables (1987), Rambo III (1988), Lethal Weapon 2 (1989), The Hunt for Red October (1990), Days of Thunder (1990), Die Hard 2 (1990), Basic Instinct (1992), Jurassic Park (1993),  Demolition Man (1993), Speed (1994), L.A. Confidential (1997), The Lost World: Jurassic Park (1997), Armageddon (1998) and Wild Wild West (1999).

As an actor, he is probably best known for playing the assimilated borg Ensign Lynch in Star Trek: First Contact.

Epper died on December 1, 2007, just five weeks before his 63rd birthday.  Epper is survived by five children, Lisa, Danielle, Gary, Madison and Nicole, and five grandchildren, Brie, Skyler, Emma, Maggie and Kate.

Filmography

References

External links

American stunt performers
1944 births
2007 deaths
Male actors from Los Angeles